Madonna of the Rose Bower (or Virgin in the Rose Bower) is a panel painting by the German artist Stefan Lochner, usually dated c. 1440-1442, although some art historians believe it contemporaneous with his later Dombild Altarpiece. It is usually seen as one of his finest and most closely detailed works.

The Virgin is presented as "Queen of Heaven", and is seated in a rose garden, symbolizing the heavenly Eden, under a canopy with red curtains held apart by angels. She sits on a red cut velvet bolster, holding the Christ child in her lap. Her crown and medallion are symbols of her virginity. She wears a minutely detailed brooch, which contains a representation of a seated maiden holding a unicorn.

Christ holds an apple, a symbol to signify him as the New Adam. Hovering and seated angels offer gifts of roses and apples or play music. Five kneel in the grass before her, with instruments including a portable organ, others bear fruit.

The painting is heavily infused with symbols of innocence and purity, including the red and white roses. The red roses and strawberries, by their red color, reference Christ's forthcoming Passion. Mary sits before a curved stone bench, around which grow lilies, daisies and strawberries, with an acanthus flower blooming to her left. Mary herself is presented on a monumental scale, underscoring her regal status.

Above her is pictured God the Father and the Holy Spirit in the form of a dove, together with God made Flesh sitting on her lap, Lochner has pictured the dogma of the Trinity. This arrangement of God above her also reinforces Mary's divine motherhood.

See also
 100 Great Paintings, 1980 BBC series

Notes

Sources

 Chapuis, Julien. Stefan Lochner: Image Making in Fifteenth-Century Cologne. Turnhout: Brepols, 2004.    
 Wellesz, Emmy; Rothenstein, John (ed). Stephan Lochner. London: Fratelli Fabbri, 1963

Paintings by Stefan Lochner
1440s paintings
Paintings of the Madonna and Child
Angels in art
Collections of the Wallraf–Richartz Museum
Musical instruments in art